\
The Ivor Novello Appreciation Bureau is a voluntary organisation that was formed in Quedgeley, Gloucester, to foster interest in and preserve the memory of the Welsh composer and actor Ivor Novello.

Ivor Day
An annual 'Ivor Day' event is held in the Berkshire village of Littlewick Green in June. A cast of performers gather in St. John's Church to perform recitals of prose and songs.

Other events
A Thanksgiving Service was held on 6 March 2001, in the "Actors' Church," St Paul's, Covent Garden, London to mark the 50th anniversary of the passing of Ivor Novello. This was followed by a concert in the Salon of the Theatre Royal, Drury Lane.

A lilac tree was planted in the grounds of St. John's Church, Littlewick Green, on 10 June 2001.

Officials
The Honorary Administrator is Nicholas Gaze, and he is assisted by Mary Falby and Chris Sansom.

The patrons are the sopranos Marilyn Hill-Smith and Sandra Watkins.

References

External links
 Official website

Arts organisations based in the United Kingdom